Amos Lawrence Allen (March 17, 1837 – February 20, 1911) was a U.S. Representative from Maine.

Born in Waterboro, Maine, Allen attended the common schools, Whitestown Seminary in Whitestown, New York, and graduated from Bowdoin College in 1860. He studied law at Columbian Law School, Washington, D.C., and was admitted to the bar of York County in 1866, but never practiced. He served as a clerk in the United States Treasury Department from 1867 to 1870.

Allen was elected clerk of the courts for York County, Maine in 1870. He was reelected three times and served until January 1, 1883. He served in the Maine House of Representatives in 1886 and 1887. He was private secretary to Speaker Thomas B. Reed in the Fifty-first, Fifty-fourth, and Fifty-fifth Congresses. He served as delegate at large to the Republican National Convention at St. Louis in 1896.

Allen was elected as a Republican to the Fifty-sixth Congress to fill the vacancy caused by the resignation of Thomas B. Reed. He was reelected to the Fifty-seventh and to the four succeeding Congresses and served from November 6, 1899, until his death in Washington, D.C. on February 20, 1911, from pneumonia. He was interred in Evergreen Cemetery, Alfred, Maine.

See also
List of United States Congress members who died in office (1900–49)

References

External links

 Amos L. Allen, late a representative from Maine, Memorial addresses delivered in the House of Representatives and Senate frontispiece 1912

1837 births
1911 deaths
People from Waterboro, Maine
Bowdoin College alumni
Republican Party members of the United States House of Representatives from Maine
Republican Party members of the Maine House of Representatives
People from Alfred, Maine
19th-century American politicians
Deaths from pneumonia in Washington, D.C.